Psomocolax rhabdophora is a moth of the family Psychidae first described by George Hampson in 1893. It is found in India and Sri Lanka.

Larval host plants are Camellia sinensis and Cinchona species.

References

Moths of Asia
Moths described in 1893
Psychidae